Meshkan District is a district (bakhsh) in Khoshab County, Razavi Khorasan Province, Iran. At the 2006 census, its population was 10,607, in 2,660 families.  The District has no cities. The District has two rural districts (dehestan): Meshkan Rural District and Yam Rural District.

References 

Districts of Razavi Khorasan Province
Khoshab County